Leo Aloysius Pursley (March 12, 1902 – November 15, 1998) was an American clergyman of the Roman Catholic Church. He served as bishop of the Diocese of Fort Wayne-South Bend in Indiana from 1956 to 1976.

Biography

Early life 
Leo Pursley was born on March 12, 1902, in Hartford City, Indiana, to Alexander Nelson and Mary Jeanette (née Sloan) Pursley. His father was a local Democratic politician and delegate to the 1940 Democratic National Convention. He studied at Mount St. Mary's Seminary of the West in Cincinnati,

Priesthood 
Pursley was ordained to the priesthood for the Diocese of Fort Wayne on June 11, 1927 by Bishop John Noll. After his ordination, Pursley served in the following assignments in Indiana parishes:

 Curate at St. Mary in Lafayette
 Curate at St. Lawrence in Muncie
 Curate at St. Patrick in Fort Wayne
 Pastor of Sacred Heart in Warsaw 
 Pastor of St. John the Baptist in Fort Wayne

Auxiliary Bishop and Bishop of Fort Wayne-South Bend 
On July 22, 1950, Pursley was appointed as an auxiliary bishop of the Diocese of Fort Wayne and titular bishop of Hadrianopolis in Pisidia by Pope Pius XII. He received his episcopal consecration on September 19, 1950, from Archbishop Amleto Cicognani, with Bishops Noll and Joseph M. Marling serving as co-consecrators. 

Following the death of Bishop Noll, Pursley was named bishop of what was now the Diocese of Fort Wayne-South Bend on December 29, 1956. His installation took place at the Cathedral of the Immaculate Conception in Fort Wayne on February 26, 1957. Pursley attended all four sessions of the Second Vatican Council in Rome from 1962 to 1965.

Retirement and legacy 
On August 24, 1976, Pope Paul VI accepted Pursley's resignation as bishop of Fort Wayne-South Bend. Leo Pursley died in Fort Wayne on November 15, 1998, at age 96.

In 2008, it was revealed in court papers that Pursley in 1972 wrote to Bishop John Marshall of the Diocese of Burlington about Edward Paquette, a priest of the Diocese of Fort Wayne-South Bend.  Paquette wanted to transfer to Vermont.  Pursley warned Marshall that Paquette had been accused of molesting boys and should, if accepted in Vermont, be kept away from children.  Marshall allowed Paquette to transfer, but ignored Pursley's advice.  In 2008, the Diocese of Burlington paid out a $8.7 million settlement to a Vermont sexual abuse victim of Paquette.

See also

References

1902 births
1998 deaths
People from Blackford County, Indiana
20th-century Roman Catholic bishops in the United States
Participants in the Second Vatican Council
Roman Catholic bishops of Fort Wayne–South Bend
The Athenaeum of Ohio alumni